Marthod is a commune in the Savoie department in the Auvergne-Rhône-Alpes region in south-eastern France.

See also
Communes of the Savoie department

References

Communes of Savoie